Mount Michael is an active volcanic mountain, 843 m, surmounting Saunders Island in the South Sandwich Islands, a British Overseas Territory in the southern Atlantic Ocean. It is one of the few volcanoes in an overseas territory of the United Kingdom. The island was discovered by a British expedition under Cook in 1775, but the mountain was presumably first charted in 1820 by a Russian expedition under Bellingshausen. Recharted in 1930 by DI personnel on the Commander W.M. Carey, Royal Navy, captain of the Discovery II at the time of the survey.

Persistent lava lake
In 2019, it was discovered that Mount Michael has a persistent lava lake, a rare phenomenon which is known to occur at only eight volcanoes in the world.

References

External links
 

Michael, Mount
Volcanoes of the Atlantic Ocean
Holocene stratovolcanoes
Active volcanoes
Lava lakes